Corrugated galvanised iron or steel, colloquially corrugated iron (near universal), wriggly tin (taken from UK military slang), pailing (in Caribbean English), corrugated sheet metal (in North America) and occasionally abbreviated CGI is a building material composed of sheets of hot-dip galvanised mild steel, cold-rolled to produce a linear ridged pattern in them. Although it is still popularly called "iron" in the UK, the material used is actually steel (which is iron alloyed with carbon for strength, commonly 0.3% carbon), and only the surviving vintage sheets may actually be made up of 100% iron. The corrugations increase the bending strength of the sheet in the direction perpendicular to the corrugations, but not parallel to them, because the steel must be stretched to bend perpendicular to the corrugations.  Normally each sheet is manufactured longer in its strong direction.

CGI is lightweight and easily transported. It was and still is widely used especially in rural and military buildings such as sheds and water tanks.  Its unique properties were used in the development of countries such as  Australia from the 1840s, and it is still helping developing countries today.

Corrugated galvanised iron is also called corrugated steel sheet or corrugated steel metal. This is used as a roof of trench for soldiers in the military to protect them from enemy's fire attack. It can also be used as the roof of the commander's post. The phrase "Corrugated Steel Sheet" was used in the book, "Infantry Combat", therefore, we can assume that corrugated galvanised iron is used as corrugated steel sheet in the military.

History 

Henry Robinson Palmer, architect and engineer to the London Dock Company, was granted a patent in 1829 for "indented or corrugated metallic sheets". It was originally made from wrought iron. It proved to be light, strong, corrosion-resistant, and easily transported, and particularly lent itself to prefabricated structures and improvisation by semi-skilled workers. It soon became a common construction material in rural areas in the United States, Argentina, Spain, New Zealand and Australia and later India, and in Australia and Argentina also became (and remains) a common roofing material even in urban areas. In Australia and New Zealand particularly it has become part of the cultural identity, and fashionable architectural use has become common. CGI is also widely used as building material in African slums and informal settlements.

CGI is also a common construction material for industrial buildings throughout the world.

Wrought iron CGI was gradually replaced by mild steel from around the 1890s, and iron CGI is no longer obtainable, but the common name has not been changed. Galvanised sheets with simple corrugations are also being gradually displaced by 55% Al-Zn coated steel or coil-painted sheets with complex profiles. CGI remains common.

Corrugation today 
Today the corrugation process is carried out using the process of roll forming. This modern process is highly automated to achieve high productivity and low costs associated with labour. In the corrugation process sheet metal is pulled off huge rolls and through rolling dies that form the corrugation. After the sheet metal passes through the rollers it is automatically sheared off at a desired length. The traditional shape of corrugated material is the round wavy style, but different dies form a variety of shapes and sizes. Industrial buildings are often built with and covered by trapezoidal sheet metal.

Many materials today undergo the corrugation process. The most common materials for corrugated iron are ferrous alloys (e.g. stainless steels), aluminium and copper. Regular ferrous alloys are the most common due to price and availability. Common sizes of corrugated material can range from a very thin 30 gauge to a relatively thick 6 gauge. Thicker or thinner gauges may also be produced.

Other materials such as thermoplastic and  fiberglass-reinforced plastic sheets are also produced with corrugations. Clear or translucent products can allow light to penetrate below.

Pitch and depth 

The corrugations are described in terms of pitch (the distance between two crests) and depth (the height from the top of a crest to the bottom of a trough). It is important for the pitch and depth to be quite uniform, in order for the sheets to be easily stackable for transport, and to overlap neatly when joining two sheets. Pitches have ranged from 25 mm (1 inch) to 125 mm (5 inches).

It was once common for CGI used for vertical walls to have a shorter pitch and depth than roofing CGI. This shorter pitched material was sometimes called "rippled" instead of "corrugated". 
However nowadays, nearly all CGI produced has the same pitch of 3 inches (76 mm).

A design of corrugated galvanised steel sheets "Proster 21", used as formwork, has 21 millimetre deep V-shaped pits.

Echo
Clapping  hands or snapping  one's fingers whilst standing next to perpendicular sheets of corrugated iron (for example, in a fence) will produce a high-pitched  echo with a rapidly falling pitch. This is due to a sequence of echoes from adjacent corrugations. 

The first part of the echo will have a much higher pitch because the sound impulses from iron nearly opposite the clapper will arrive almost simultaneously.

Corrosion

Although galvanising inhibits the corrosion of steel, rusting is inevitable, especially in marine areas – where the salt water encourages rust – and areas where the local rainfall is acidic. Corroded corrugated steel roofs can last for many years, particularly if the sheets are protected by a layer of paint.

See also
 Chattel house
 Metal roof
 Nissen hut
Quonset hut
Theorema Egregium, for more information on why corrugation increases strength
 Tin tabernacle

References

External links 

Corrugated Metal Roofing & Paneling
 Heritage Roofing in Victoria, Australia (PDF, 181 kB)

Steels
Building materials
Corrugation
Roofing materials